The Estoril Open was a golf tournament on the European Tour in 1999. It was held at Penha Longa in Estoril, Portugal from 15 to 18 April. It was won by Jean-François Remésy who shot a 2-under-par total of 286, to finish as the only player under par.

The renewal of the Estoril Open in 2000 was cancelled due to sponsorship problems. The event was also included on the European Tour schedule in 2001, but was cancelled again.

Winners

References

External links
Coverage on the European Tour's official site

Former European Tour events
Golf tournaments in Portugal
Sport in Estoril
Defunct sports competitions in Portugal